The Chappel Limestone is a geologic formation in Texas. It preserves fossils dating back to the Carboniferous period.

In 1959 Wilbert H. Hass described the conodont genus Dollymae from that formation.

See also

 List of fossiliferous stratigraphic units in Texas
 Paleontology in Texas

References

Further reading 
 

Carboniferous Texas
Carboniferous southern paleotemperate deposits
Carboniferous southern paleotropical deposits